Advice is the third Korean extended play (sixth overall) recorded by South Korean singer Taemin. It was released on May 18, 2021, by SM Entertainment and distributed by Dreamus, produced by Cutfather, PhD, Moonshine and Ryan S. Jhun, among others. The album contains five songs including the lead single, "Advice".

Background and composition
Taemin released his third studio album Never Gonna Dance Again: Act 2 in November 2020. On May 3, 2021, the singer's label SM Entertainment announced that Taemin would be releasing a new EP the same month, which will mark his final release before his military enlistment. The album's title Advice and cover art were revealed simultaneously. The title track would serve as the lead single of the album. "Advice" was described as an R&B song that employs piano flourishes and a choir arrangement over a trap beat. "If I Could Tell You" is a collaboration with Girls' Generation member Taeyeon. It was described as a "dreamy" R&B-pop song featuring electronic piano and soft synthesizer sounds. "Light" is a dance-pop song produced by Moonshine, featuring groovy beats, synth sounds, and vocal harmonies. "Strings" is an R&B song that is driven by arpeggio guitar riffs, in which Taemin compares himself to a string instrument. "Sad Kids" is a midtempo pop song in a minimalist arrangement of guitars.

Release and promotion
Taemin premiered the title track on his solo concert, Never Gonna Dance Again on May 2. Image concept teasers were uploaded to Shinee's social media accounts on May 10, 11, 12, and 13. On May 18, Taemin held a live event on Naver's V Live app to introduce songs from the album. Taemin promoted the title track with televised live performances on various South Korean music programs including M Countdown, Show! Music Core and Inkigayo.

Reception 
Writing for the South China Morning Post, Tamar Herman praised Advice for its "creativity and androgynous aesthetic". She described Taemin as charismatic and versatile.

Year-end lists

Track listing

Charts

Weekly charts

Monthly charts

Year-end charts

Sales

Release history

References

External links 

 Taemin's official page
 "Advice" music video

2021 EPs
Korean-language EPs
Taemin EPs
SM Entertainment EPs